The following is a timeline of the history of the city of Duhok, Iraq.

Prior to 21st century
 1842 - Dohuk was joined to Mosul Vilayet .
 1873 - Duhok was becoming District followed Mosul Vilayet.
 1918 - Duhok occupied by British forces on November.
 1928 - The first primary school for girls was opened .
 1936 - Ali Afandi became first Director Municipality of Duhok .
 1962 - Badirkhanya Library established .
 1969 - Ageed Sediq Sedullah Amedi became first  Governor of Duhok.
 1970 - Duhok SC (football club) formed .
 1978 - Duhok Chamber of Commerce and industry founded.
 1988 - Duhok Dam built .
 1991 - 14 March: Uprising against Saddam Hussein.
 1992 - 31 October:University of Duhok established.

21st century
 2011 – Many stores selling alcohol and massage parlours crashed by many angry Kurds
 2012 - The Duhok Polytechnic University established .
 2014 - The American University of Kurdistan established .
 2017 - A fire destroys almost 90 stores in Duhok Bzaaar .
 2019 - 4 May: Shahidan Mosque built .

References

Years in Iraq
Duhok
Duhok
Iraqi Kurdistan
Kurdistan Region (Iraq)